The 138th Street station was a station on the Harlem and Hudson Lines of the New York Central Railroad, serving the community of Mott Haven in the Bronx, New York City. It was the southernmost station along both branches until 1973. The New York, New Haven and Hartford Railroad also ran through this station but did not stop here.

History
The New York and Harlem Railroad expanded their main line across the Harlem River through Mott Haven into Williams Bridge from a bridge built in 1841. This bridge would be replaced in 1867, 1897, and 1956. A station named Mott Haven was known to exist as far back as 1858. The station was rebuilt in a much more elaborate fashion in 1886, with the construction of a Richardson Romanesque structure designed by Robert Henderson Robertson, and was hailed as "the finest and most complete way station in the country". Originally at street level, the tracks were later raised above ground level as part of a grade elimination project in order to accommodate the 1897 version of the Park Avenue Bridge. A major grade elimination project in the Bronx north of the station also took place between 1888 and 1890.

Throughout most of the station's existence, it has been in relatively close proximity to mass transit. In 1887, the Suburban Rapid Transit Company built a station along the Third Avenue Elevated several blocks to the east. By 1918, its successor, the Interborough Rapid Transit Company expanded the IRT Jerome Avenue Line south from 149th Street to the Lexington Avenue Tunnel into the IRT Lexington Avenue Line in Harlem, and built a subway station beneath the vicinity of the railroad station. The subway station still exists.

During the Great Depression, New York Central had proposed to build a new station in Mott Haven eleven blocks to the north at 149th Street, just south of Mott Haven Junction. Mosaics at the 149th Street–Grand Concourse subway station complex direct commuters to this proposed station which was never built. Only the tunnel to the station was built and was closed by the New York City Transit Authority.

Declining ridership following World War II, along with the decline of the South Bronx led to the demolition of the previous structure in 1966, and the replacement with little more than sheltered platforms. As with other NYC stations in the Bronx, 138th Street became a Penn Central station once the NYC & Pennsylvania Railroads merged in 1968. Penn Central acquired the New Haven Railroad in 1969, but the New Haven still never stopped there. However, because of the railroad's serious financial distress following the merger, commuter service was turned over to the Metropolitan Transportation Authority in 1972. The station was closed by Penn Central on July 2, 1973, along with Morrisania, and 183rd Street stations in the South Bronx. The site of the station is today a location of a local community garden.

References

External links
The Lost Train Station of the Bronx – 138th Street, Mott Haven (I Ride the Harlem Line)

Former railway stations in New York (state)
Former New York Central Railroad stations
Railway stations in the Bronx
Railway stations in the United States opened in 1858
Railway stations closed in 1972
Mott Haven, Bronx